Air Chief Marshal Sir Charles Edward Hastings Medhurst,  (12 December 1896 – 18 October 1954) was a First World War Royal Flying Corps pilot on the Western Front and later a senior officer in the Royal Air Force.

RAF career
Medhurst was awarded Royal Aero Club pilot certificate No. 1437 on 13 July 1913. He was commissioned into The Royal Inniskilling Fusiliers on 16 June 1915 and in a few months was training to be a pilot with the Royal Flying Corps. He was soon operational on the Western Front flying the Nieuport Scout with No. 13 Squadron. In 1917 he became the officer commanding No. 14 Squadron operating in Palestine. On 1 August 1919 he was awarded a permanent commission as a captain in the Royal Air Force and by 1925 had attended the RAF Staff College. He became Officer Commanding No. 4 Squadron in 1930 and he joined the Directing Staff at the RAF Staff College in 1931 before becoming deputy director of Intelligence at the Air Ministry in 1935. He then went to Rome as Air Attaché in 1937.

Medhurst held a number of staff appointments during the Second World War including RAF Secretary of the Supreme War Council from 1940, Director of Allied Air Co-Operation and then Director of Plans all during 1940. He became Assistant Chief of the Air Staff (Intelligence) in 1941 and after a spell as Temporary Vice-Chief of the Air Staff later in 1942 he became Assistant Chief of the Air Staff (Policy) in February 1943. In March 1943 he was appointed commandant of the RAF Staff College later moving on in February 1945 to be Air Officer in Command of RAF Middle East Command.

After the war Medhurst was made Air Officer Commanding-in-Chief, RAF Mediterranean and Middle East Command (which had absorbed his previous command when it was disbanded in August 1945). His last appointment was as Chairman of the British Joint Services Mission to Washington, D.C. in the rank of air chief marshal. Medhurst retired on 19 April 1950 and he died a few years later aged 58 on 18 October 1954.

Family
Medhurst married Christabell Guy in 1919 in York. His son Pilot Officer R. E. H. "Dickie" Medhurst was killed on 19 September 1944 when the Douglas Dakota Mk. III he was co-piloting exploded after taking Anti-Aircraft Artillery fire during an air drop mission during Operation Market Garden. His daughter Rozanne was an Italian speaker and code breaker at Bletchley Park, the Government Code and Cipher School.

References

 

|-

|-
 

|-

|-

1896 births
1954 deaths
Military personnel from Worcestershire
Knights Commander of the Order of the Bath
Officers of the Order of the British Empire
Royal Air Force air marshals
Recipients of the Military Cross
Royal Flying Corps officers
Commanders of the Legion of Merit
Commanders with Star of the Order of Polonia Restituta
Grand Commanders of the Order of George I
English aviators
Royal Inniskilling Fusiliers officers
People educated at Rossall School
Heads of RAF Intelligence
British air attachés